Jorge Caballero may refer to:

Jorge Luis Caballero Torres (born 1994), Mexican football player
Jorge Caballero (actor) (born 1992), Mexican actor